Seventh Ward may refer to:

7th Ward of New Orleans, a ward of New Orleans
Seventh Ward, New Orleans, a neighborhood of New Orleans
Ward 7 of the District of Columbia, a ward of Washington, D.C.
Ward 7, St. Louis City, an aldermanic ward of St. Louis
Ward 7, the name of several wards of Zimbabwe
Bay Ward, Ottawa (also known as Ward 7)
Ward 7 (Windsor, Ontario)